This article is about the demographic features of the population of Zimbabwe, including population density, ethnicity, education level, health of the populace, economic status, religious affiliations and other aspects of the population.

Population
The population of Zimbabwe has grown during the 20th century in accordance with the model of a developing country with high birth rates and falling death rates, resulting in relatively high population growth rate (around 3% or above in the 1960s and early 1970s). After a spurt in the period 1980-1983 following independence, a decline in birth rates set in. Since 1991, however, there has been a jump in death rates from a low of 10 per 1000 in 1985 to a high of 25 per 1000 in 2002/2003. It has since subsided to just under 22 per 1000 (estimate for 2007) a little below the birth rate of around 27 per 1000.

The high death rate is a result of poor medical facilities. This leads to a small natural increase of around 0.5%. Deaths due to HIV/AIDS have reduced due to improved methods of protection. However, outward migration rates of around 1.5% or more have been experienced for over a decade, therefore actual population changes are uncertain. Because of the high number of unaccounted emigrants, the recent increase of emigration and the death toll from AIDS, the total population might be declining to as low as 8 million according to some estimates.

Census data

Historical data of Southern Rhodesia

Current estimates

About 38.9% comprised youths under 15, while another 56.9% grouped persons aged between 15 and 65 years. Only around 4.2% of citizens were apparently over 65.

Population Estimates by Sex and Age Group (01.VII.2020):

Vital statistics
Registration of vital events in Zimbabwe is not complete. The Population Department of the United Nations prepared the following estimates.

Fertility and births
Total Fertility Rate (TFR) (Wanted Fertility Rate) and Crude Birth Rate (CBR):

Fertility data as of 2010-2011 (DHS Program):

Life expectancy at birth 
Life expectancy from 1950 to 2021 (UN World Population Prospects):

Ethnic groups
According to 2012 Census report, 99.6% of the population is of African origin.
Of the rest of the population, the great bulk—perhaps 30,000 persons—are White Zimbabweans of European ancestry, a minority which had diminished in size prior to independence.

The vast black majority has grown at a projected annual rate of 4.3% since 1980. Although present figures are difficult to ascertain, the white community once reproduced itself at an annual rate (under 1.5%) similar to that of most totals in developed nations. Of the two major ethnolinguistic categories, Shona speakers formed a decisive plurality at (80<)% and occupied the eastern two-thirds of Zimbabwe. Ndebele speakers constitute about 16%, and none of the other indigenous ethnic groups came to as much as 2% in recent decades. African speakers of nonindigenous languages included migrant workers from Malawi, Zambia, and Mozambique.

Over 90% of White Zimbabweans are of British or British diasporan origin; at various times many emigrated from South Africa and elsewhere. After World War II, Zimbabwe (then Southern Rhodesia) received a substantial influx of emigrants from the United Kingdom—a handful previously resided in other colonies such as India, Pakistan and Kenya. Also represented on a much smaller scale were individuals of Afrikaner, Greek, and Portuguese origin. After Rhodesia's Unilateral Declaration of Independence in 1965, Ian Smith's administration removed technical obstacles to immigration from southern Europe.

A heavily urbanised Coloured population is descended, partially, from early unions between White Rhodesian settlers and local Black African females. Many, however, can also trace their ancestry to the Dutch/Khoisan mulatto clans of the Cape.

With the exception of a select few who were brought to Zimbabwe as railroad workers, most Asians in Zimbabwe arrived from India pursuing employment or entrepreneurship. An educated class, they have traditionally engaged in retail trade or manufacturing.

Languages
Zimbabwe has 16 official languages: Chewa, Tonga, Chibarwe, English, Kalanga, Koisan, Nambya, Ndau, Ndebele, Shangani, Shona, sign language, Sotho, Tonga, Tswana, Venda, Xhosa. English  is widely used in administration, law and schools, though less than 2.5%, mainly the white and Coloured (mixed race) minorities, consider it their native language. The rest of the population speak Shona (70%) and Ndebele (20%), Kalanga (2%), etc. Shona has a rich oral tradition, which was incorporated into the first Shona novel, Feso by Solomon Mutswairo, published in 1956. English is spoken primarily in the cities, but less so in rural areas.  Television news is broadcast in English, Shona and Ndebele though the local languages time slot falls out of prime viewing time, but radio broadcasts in English, Ndebele, Shona, Kalanga, Nambya, Venda, Suthu and Tonga. English, Ndebele and Shona are given far more airtime.

Religions

85 percent of Zimbabweans are Christian, and of that number, 61 percent regularly attend Christian churches. The largest Christian churches are Anglican, Roman Catholic, Seventh Day Adventist and Methodist. However like most former European colonies, Christianity is often mixed with enduring traditional beliefs. Besides Christianity, ancestral worship (Amadlozi) is the most practised non-Christian religion which involves ancestor worship and spiritual intercession. Under 1% of the population is Muslim, although many Zimbabweans are influenced by Abrahamic food laws.

Health

According to the United Nations World Health Organization, the average life expectancy for men in 2006 was 37 years and for women was 34 years of age, the lowest in the world at the time. An association of doctors in Zimbabwe have made calls for President Mugabe to make moves to assist the ailing health service.
Since then it has recovered, and the figures for 2010 to 2015 were 53 and 54 for men and women respectively.

Other demographic statistics 
The following demographic statistics of Zimbabwe in 2022 are from the World Population Review.

One birth every 1 minutes	
One death every 4 minutes	
One net migrant every 7 minutes	
Net gain of one person every 2 minutes

The following demographic statistics are from the CIA World Factbook, unless otherwise indicated.

Population
15,121,004 (2022 est.)
14,030,368 (July 2018 est.)
13,805,084 (July 2017 est.)

Religions
Protestant 74.8% (includes Apostolic 37.5%, Pentecostal 21.8%, other 15.5%), Roman Catholic 7.3%, other Christian 5.3%, traditional 1.5%, Muslim 0.5%, other 0.1%, none 10.5% (2015 est.)

Age structure

0-14 years: 38.32% (male 2,759,155/female 2,814,462)
15-24 years: 20.16% (male 1,436,710/female 1,495,440)
25-54 years: 32.94% (male 2,456,392/female 2,334,973)
55-64 years: 4.07% (male 227,506/female 363,824)
65 years and over: 4.52% (male 261,456/female 396,396) (2020 est.)

0-14 years: 38.62% (male 2,681,192 /female 2,736,876)
15-24 years: 20.42% (male 1,403,715 /female 1,461,168)
25-54 years: 32.22% (male 2,286,915 /female 2,234,158)
55-64 years: 4.24% (male 233,021 /female 361,759)
65 years and over: 4.5% (male 255,704 /female 375,860) (2018 est.)

Median age
total: 20.5 years. Country comparison to the world: 189th
male: 20.3 years
female: 20.6 years (2020 est.)

total: 20.2 years. Country comparison to the world: 190th
male: 19.9 years
female: 20.4 years (2018 est.)

Birth rate
33.07 births/1,000 population (2022 est.) Country comparison to the world: 22nd
34 births/1,000 population (2018 est.) Country comparison to the world: 25th
34.2 births/1,000 population (2017 est.)

Death rate
8.76 deaths/1,000 population (2022 est.) Country comparison to the world: 68th
9.9 deaths/1,000 population (2018 est.) Country comparison to the world: 41st
10.2 deaths/1,000 population (2017 est.)

Total fertility rate
3.89 children born/woman (2022 est.) Country comparison to the world: 30th
3.97 children born/woman (2018 est.) Country comparison to the world: 33rd

Official government fertility rates over the past decade were 3.6 (2002 Census), 3.8 (2006 survey also says women actually wanted on average 3.3 children) and 3.8 (2012 Census).

Population growth rate
1.95% (2022 est.) Country comparison to the world: 44th
1.68% (2018 est.) Country comparison to the world: 60th
1.56% (2017 est.)

Mother's mean age at first birth
20 years (2015 est.)
note: median age at first birth among women 25-29

Contraceptive prevalence rate
66.8% (2015)

Net migration rate
-4.83 migrant(s)/1,000 population (2022 est.) Country comparison to the world: 200th
-7.3 migrant(s)/1,000 population (2018 est.) Country comparison to the world: 208th
-8.5 migrants/1,000 population (2017).There is an increasing flow of Zimbabweans into South Africa and Botswana in search of better economic opportunities.

Dependency ratios
total dependency ratio: 79.5 (2015 est.)
youth dependency ratio: 74.4 (2015 est.)
elderly dependency ratio: 5.1 (2015 est.)
potential support ratio: 19.7 (2015 est.)

Urbanization

urban population: 66% of total population (2022)
rate of urbanization: 2.41% annual rate of change (2020-25 est.)

urban population: 32.2% of total population (2018)
rate of urbanization: 2.19% annual rate of change (2015-20 est.)

Major infectious diseases
degree of risk: high (2020)
food or waterborne diseases: bacterial and protozoal diarrhea, hepatitis A, and typhoid fever
vectorborne diseases: malaria and dengue fever
water contact diseases: schistosomiasis
animal contact diseases: rabies

Sex ratio
(2011 est.)
 at birth: 1.03 male(s)/female
 under 15 years: 1.02 male(s)/female
 15-64 years: 0.92 male(s)/female
 65 years and over: 0.70 male(s)/female
 total population: 0.95 male(s)/female

AIDS
Adult prevalence rate
  13.3% (2017 est.)
  15.3% (2007)
  33.7% (2001 est.)
  25% (1999 estimate).
People living with HIV/AIDS
 1.3 million (2017 est.)
 1.3 million (2007 est.)
 2.3 million (2001 est.)
Deaths
 22,000 (2017 est.)
 140,000 (2007 est.)
 200,000 (2001 est.)
 160,000 annually (1999 estimate).

Life expectancy at birth
total population: 63.32 years. Country comparison to the world: 209
male: 61.18 years (2022 est.)
female: 65.52 years (2022 est.)

total population: 61.1 years
male 59 years
female: 63.2 years (2018 est.)

total population 60.4 years
male 58.3 years
female 62.5 years (2017 est.)

total population 47.55 years
male 47.98 years
female 47.11 years (2010 est.)

Physicians density
0.08 physicians/1,000 population (2014)

Hospital bed density
1.7 beds/1,000 population (2011)

Obesity - adult prevalence rate
15.5% (2015)

Children under the age of 5 years underweight
8.4% (2015)

Education expenditures
3.6% of GDP (2018) Country comparison to the world: 122nd
7.5% of GDP (2014) Country comparison to the world: 10th

Literacy
definition* age 15 and over can read and write English
total population: 95%
male: 96.5%
female: 90.5% (2022 est.)

total population* 90.7% (2003 est.), 85% (2000 est.)
male* 94.2% (2003 est.), 90% (2000 est.)
female* 87.2% (2003 est.), 80% (1995 est.)

School life expectancy (primary to tertiary education)
total: 11 years
male: 12 years
female: 11 years (2013)

Unemployment, youth ages 15-24
total: 27.5%
male: 25%
female: 31.4% (2019 est.)

Nationality
 noun: Zimbabwean(s)
 adjective: Zimbabwean

Ethnic groups
African 99.4% (predominantly Shona; Ndebele is the second largest ethnic group)
White Zimbabweans 0.4%
Other (primarily Indian) 0.2%

Languages
Shona (official; most widely spoken), Ndebele (official, second most widely spoken), English (official; traditionally used for official business), 13 minority languages (official; includes Chewa, Chibarwe, Kalanga, Koisan, Nambya, Ndau, Shangani, sign language, Sotho, Tonga, Tswana, Venda, and Xhosa).

References